The Canton of Troyes-1 is a canton of the arrondissement of Troyes, in the Aube department, in northern France. Since the French canton reorganisation which came into effect in March 2015, the canton of Troyes-1 covers part of the commune of Troyes.

References

Troyes-1
Troyes